Joseph Jacques Marcel Bonin (born September 12, 1931) is a Canadian former professional ice hockey forward. He played in the National Hockey League with the Detroit Red Wings, Boston Bruins, and Montreal Canadiens between 1952 and 1962. He won the Stanley Cup four times in his career, once with Detroit and three times with Montreal.

Playing career
Bonin's National Hockey League career began during the 1952 after the Red Wings bought his contract from the Quebec Aces of the Quebec Senior Hockey League.

On June 3, 1955, Bonin was dealt in a blockbuster trade to the Boston Bruins along with teammates Terry Sawchuk, Vic Stasiuk and Lorne Davis in exchange for Ed Sandford, Real Chevrefils, Norm Corcoran, Gilles Boisvert and Warren Godfrey. After a single season with the Bruins, Bonin returned to the Quebec Aces for a season before being claimed by the Montreal Canadiens in the 1957 NHL Intraleague Draft.

Bonin won the Stanley Cup four times, doing so in 1955 with Detroit and in 1958, 1959, and 1960 with Montreal.

Bonin's career was ended following on-ice collision with Red Wings defenceman Pete Goegan on February 9, 1962 resulting in a severe back injury.

Career statistics

Regular season and playoffs

Awards and achievements
Stanley Cup champion - 1955, 1958, 1959, 1960
NHL All-Star Game roster - 1954, 1957, 1958, 1959, 1960

References

External links 
 
 Marcel Bonin's Day With the Stanley Cup

1931 births
Living people
Boston Bruins players
Canadian ice hockey forwards
Detroit Red Wings players
Edmonton Flyers (WHL) players
Ice hockey people from Montreal
Montreal Canadiens players
Quebec Aces (QSHL) players
Rochester Americans players
St. Louis Flyers players
Stanley Cup champions